Protein Mis18-alpha is a protein that in humans is encoded by the MIS18A gene.

References

External links

Further reading